Anne Elizabeth Magurran  (born 1955) is a British Professor of ecology at University of St Andrews in Scotland. She is the author of several books on measuring biological diversity, and the importance for quantifying biodiversity for conservation. She has won numerous awards and honors, is regularly consulted for global assessments and analyses of biodiversity and conservation and her research is often highlighted by journalists.

Magurran has worked with Robert May and other leading biologists, including Helder Queiroz, whom she advised. Her research projects often focus are on tropical freshwater fish communities - specifically the Trinidadian guppy- in the Neotropics and India.

Research and career 
Magurran completed her PhD at the University of Ulster on the biological diversity of native woodlands in Ireland. She then went on to complete postdoctoral work at  Bangor University and the University of Oxford. Throughout her career she has used fish communities to study biodiversity, the evolution of biodiversity, and on the role of predation in the evolution of social behaviour. She is now a professor at the University of St Andrews, where she is the university's most cited female scientist. Globally, she is the second most cited female ecologist  and evolutionary biologist. She is an international counselor and advisor on issues of conservation related to biodiversity and engaged in the UN Convention on Biological Diversity and in the World Economic Forum in 2018.

Magurran was appointed Commander of the Order of the British Empire (CBE) in the 2022 New Year Honours for services to biodiversity.

Selected awards and honours 
 2022 - Distinguished Service Award from the Europe Section of the Society for Conservation Biology (SCB)
 2022 - Commander of the Order of the British Empire (CBE)
 2021 - Member of the Royal Irish Academy.
 2017 - Plenary Talk, Argentinian International Ecology Meeting
 2014 - Honorary Doctor of Science Degree, University of Bergen
 2012 - Royal Society Wolfson Research Merit Award
 2006 - Honorary Life Membership, Fisheries Society of the British Isles
 2004 - Fellow of the Royal Society of Edinburgh
 1994 - Scientific Medal, Zoological Society of London

Selected publications 
 
 Magurran, A. E. 2004. Measuring biological diversity. Oxford: Blackwell Publishing. 
 
 Magurran, A. E. & R. M. May (eds.). 1999. Evolution of Biological Diversity. Oxford University Press. .

External links 
 
Google Scholar

References 

British biologists
British women scientists
1955 births
Living people
Academics of the University of St Andrews
Alumni of Ulster University
Fellows of the Royal Society of Edinburgh
Members of the Royal Irish Academy
Commanders of the Order of the British Empire